Augher was a constituency represented in the Irish House of Commons until the Acts of Union 1800 came into force on 1 January 1801.

History
In the Patriot Parliament of 1689 summoned by James II, Augher was not represented.

Members of Parliament, 1613–1801

Notes

References

Parliamentary Memoirs of Fermanagh and Tyrone, from 1613 to 1885

Bibliography

Constituencies of the Parliament of Ireland (pre-1801)
Historic constituencies in County Tyrone
1614 establishments in Ireland
1800 disestablishments in Ireland
Constituencies established in 1614
Constituencies disestablished in 1800